Víctor Hugo Velasco Orozco (born 17 November 1971) is a Mexican politician affiliated with the PRI. As of 2013 he served as Deputy of the LXII Legislature of the Mexican Congress representing Hidalgo.

References

1971 births
Living people
Politicians from Hidalgo (state)
Institutional Revolutionary Party politicians
People from Tulancingo
21st-century Mexican politicians
Deputies of the LXII Legislature of Mexico
Members of the Chamber of Deputies (Mexico) for Hidalgo (state)